Big River State Forest is a conservation area on  in Henderson County, Illinois, United States.

External links
 DNR Big River State Forest site
 U.S. Geological Survey Map at the U.S. Geological Survey Map Website. Retrieved December 6th, 2022.

Illinois state forests
Protected areas of Henderson County, Illinois
Protected areas established in 1925
1925 establishments in Illinois